Eric Dwayne Collins (born October 8, 1969) better known by his stage name RBX (standing for "Reality Born Unknown"), is an American rapper and songwriter from Long Beach, California.

Early life and education
Contrary to popular belief, Collins is not related to funk legend Bootsy Collins, although the two are close friends.

Career

Death Row Records
RBX joined Death Row Records in 1992 with his cousins Snoop Dogg and Daz Dillinger. A former college student and retail manager, Collins declined to sign blank contracts like his Death Row brethren. His tenure on the label would be brief but memorable. Having made commanding cameos on The Chronic in 1992 and Doggystyle in 1993, RBX left the label in 1994 and signed with the lesser known Premeditated Records. He released The RBX Files in 1995, his debut solo album that was produced by former Chronic production team member Greg "Gregski" Royal.

The album abandoned the popular West Coast G-Funk style in favor of a "gritty, dungeon-like" sound more associated with New York. The single "A.W.O.L." was an attack on Death Row, Suge Knight, Dre, and others, with X comparing the dubious business practices there to the days of Ruthless Records, Jerry Heller, and Eazy-E. In a YouTube interview with VladTV he talked about an altercation over food between him and Suge Knight, in which Knight pulled out a gun.

Aftermath Entertainment
In 1996, RBX visited Dr. Dre at home and apologized for his harsh words on record and in magazines and immediately signed to Dre's new Aftermath label. He was featured on the 1996 compilation Dr. Dre Presents... The Aftermath on the solo song "Blunt Time" and the group track "East Coast/West Coast Killaz" with KRS-One, B-Real, Scarface and Nas, with both songs produced by Dre. Lost in the infamous reshuffling of Aftermath in 1998, RBX once again went solo and released his follow up album No Mercy, No Remorse on an independent label in 1999. He reappeared with Aftermath to cameo on Eminem's The Marshall Mathers LP in 2000.

Current
In 2022, RBX began work with Los Angeles based producers Sccit & Siavash The Grouch on his comeback album “Hibernation Shivers”. The Labcabin Records release is set to include features from Spice-1, MC Eiht, Daz Dillinger, Fatlip, Project Pat, Eligh, Cold 187um, Krayzie Bone, Butch Cassidy, Smoov-E & more. On April 20th, 2022, RBX assisted Fatlip with the release of a single for Fatlip’s album, “Torpor”, in the Sccit & Siavash The Grouch produced song titled “Wake Up”. The single was accompanied by a music video, which was themed around the Los Angeles homeless epidemic.

Discography

Studio albums
The RBX Files (1995)
No Mercy, No Remorse (1999)
Ripp tha Game Bloody: Street Muzic (2004)
The Shining (2005)
Broken Silence (2007)
Hibernation Shivers (2023)

Collaboration albums
Concrete Criminal Gang with Bigg Rocc (2010)

Mixtapes
X1: Westside Radio Vol. 18 (2007)
X2: Digital Kush (2009)
X3: Calm Before the Storm (2011)
X4: Water for Sharks (2012)
X5: Immortal Instamentalz (The New Bloccmixx) (2014)

EPs
Tha Equinox (2019)

Guest appearances 
{| class="wikitable plainrowheaders" style="text-align:center;"
! scope="col" style="width:20em;"| Title
! scope="col" | Release
! scope="col" | Other performer(s)
! scope="col" | Album
|-
! scope="row" | "The Day the Niggaz Took Over"
| rowspan="3" | 1992
| Dr. Dre, Dat Nigga Daz, Snoop Doggy Dogg
| rowspan="3" | The Chronic
|-
! scope="row" | "Lyrical Gangbang"
| Dr. Dre, Kurupt, The Lady of Rage
|-
! scope="row" | "Stranded on Death Row"
| Dr. Dre, Bushwick Bill, Kurupt, Snoop Doggy Dogg, The Lady of Rage
|-
! scope="row" | "Serial Killa"
| rowspan="1" | 1993
| Snoop Doggy Dogg, Tha Dogg Pound, The D.O.C.
| rowspan="1" | Doggystyle
|-
! scope="row" | "East Coast/West Coast Killas"
| rowspan="2" | 1996
| Nas, B-Real, KRS-One (as Group Therapy)
| rowspan="2" | Dr. Dre Presents the Aftermath
|-
! scope="row" | "Blunt Time"
|-
! scope="row" | "So Watcha Want"
| rowspan="2" | 1998
| MC Ren, Snoop Dogg
| rowspan="1" | Ruthless for Life
|-
! scope="row" | "Bustaz"
| Lil' C-Style, Legacy, Tray Deee
| rowspan="1" | C-Style Presents 19th Street LBC Compilation
|-
! scope="row" | "Ten Steps and Draw"
| rowspan="3" | 1999
| Q'sta The Don, B.G. Knocc Out
| rowspan="1" | Finer Things
|-
! scope="row" | "Flip Side"
| Silva Satin
| rowspan="1" | Escape From Death Row
|-
! scope="row" | "Gangsta Love"
| Warren G, Nate Dogg, Kurupt
| rowspan="1" | I Want It All
|-
! scope="row" | "Trouble"
| rowspan="3" | 2000
| Daddy V, Nate Dogg, E-White
|-
! scope="row" | "Souljas"
| 504 Boyz, Snoop Dogg
| rowspan="1" | Goodfellas
|-
! scope="row" | "Remember Me?"
| Eminem, Sticky Fingaz
| rowspan="1" | The Marshall Mathers LP
|-
! scope="row" | "Dipp Wit Me"
| rowspan="6" | 2001
| DPG
| rowspan="1" | Dillinger & Young Gotti
|-
! scope="row" | "Remember Me (Remix)"
| Eminem, Sticky Fingaz
| rowspan="1" | Shady Lane : Remix Album
|-
! scope="row" | "When You See Me"
| Bad Azz, Snoop Dogg, Kokane
| rowspan="1" | Personal Business
|-
! scope="row" | "Dogghouse In Your Mouth"
| Tha Eastsidaz, Suga Free, Soopafly, Kurupt, Ruff Dogg, King Lou, Mixmaster Spade
| rowspan="1" | Duces 'n Trayz: The Old Fashioned Way
|-
! scope="row" | "Legend of Jimmy Bones"
| Snoop Dogg, MC Ren
| rowspan="1" | Bones
|-
! scope="row" | "Freestyle Fellowship"
| Freestyle Fellowship
| rowspan="1" | Temptations
|-
! scope="row" | "Doin' It Bigg
| rowspan="8" | 2002
| E-White
| rowspan="4" | Snoop Dogg Presents... Doggy Style Allstars Vol. 1
|-
! scope="row" | "The Strong Will Eat the Weak"
| Snoop Dogg, Kokane
|-
! scope="row" | "Light That Shit Up"
| Snoop Dogg, Soopafly, Kokane
|-
! scope="row" | "Not Like It Was"
| Snoop Dogg, Soopafly, E-White, Kokane, Latoya Williams
|-
! scope="row" | "Batman & Robin"
| Snoop Dogg, The Lady of Rage
| rowspan="1" | Paid tha Cost to Be da Boss
|-
! scope="row" | "My Nine"
| Daddy V, Squeak Ru
| rowspan="1" | Compton OG
|-
! scope="row" | "Ortiz Anthem"
| Fieldy's Dreams
| rowspan="2" | Rock'n Roll Gangster
|-
! scope="row" | "Do What You Feel"
| Fieldy's Dreams, Polarbear
|-
! scope="row" | "Picasso"
| rowspan="3" | 2003
| Myka Nyne
| rowspan="2" | A Work In Progress
|-
! scope="row" | "XJ9"
| Myka Nyne, Brother J
|-
! scope="row" | "We Came Here 2 Ride"
| Warren G
| rowspan="1" | True Crime: Streets of LA soundtrack
|-
! scope="row" | "Stand Up"
| rowspan="9" | 2004
| Tony Smallz
| rowspan="1" | Smoke in tha City
|-
! scope="row" | "The Line"
| Metrocross
| rowspan="1" | WestCoast Offense Vol. 1
|-
! scope="row" | "Gun Down"
| Daddy V
| rowspan="1" | OGTV: The Soundtrack
|-
! scope="row" | "Don't Lokk at Nann Nigga !"
| Lil Half Dead, Depp, Tripp Locc, Young Sagg, Tek
| rowspan="4" | Welcome 2 Tha Chuuch Vol. 1
|-
! scope="row" | "DPG Life"
|-
! scope="row" | "A.D.I.D.A.C."
| Snoop Dogg, Bishop Don Juan, Lil' ½ Dead, Bad Azz, E-White
|-
! scope="row" | "What You Desire"
| Snoop Dogg, Xzibit
|-
! scope="row" | "Murda"
| Snoop Dogg, Bad Azz
| rowspan="1" | Welcome 2 Tha Chuuch Vol. 2
|-
! scope="row" | "Moet"
| E-White, Tripp Locc, Snoop Dogg
| rowspan="1" | Welcome 2 Tha Chuuch Vol. 3
|-
! scope="row" | "Money"
| rowspan="5" | 2005
| Bigg Steele
| rowspan="1" | Size Duz Matter
|-
! scope="row" | "I'm Broad"
| Coss
| rowspan="1" | Long Beach City Limits Vol. 1
|-
! scope="row" | "These Muthafuckaz"
| Snoop Dogg
| rowspan="1" | Welcome 2 Tha Chuuch Vol. 4 : Sunday School
|-
! scope="row" | "Get You Done"
| The Brokerage Firm
| rowspan="1" | Tax Returns
|-
! scope="row" | "Notorious DPG"
| The Lady of Rage, Kurupt
| rowspan="1" | Bigg Snoop Dogg Presents...Welcome to tha Chuuch: Da Album
|-
! scope="row" | "Reprisal"
| rowspan="8" | 2006
| Bigg Steele, Polar Bear
| rowspan="1" | Chronicles of Big Steele Volume 2
|-
! scope="row" | "Killing Fields"
| Contribution X, Beretta 9, Hailoe
| rowspan="3" | Cobra of the North
|-
! scope="row" | "Some Say"
| Contribution X, Monk
|-
! scope="row" | "Iron Hands"
| Contribution X, Monk, DJ Gloss
|-
! scope="row" | "Free"
|
| rowspan="1" | Up Above Records: Carving a New Standard Vol. 1
|-
! scope="row" | "Don't Sweat It"
| Tha Dogg Pound, Nate Dogg
| rowspan="2" | Cali Iz Active
|-
! scope="row" | "Hard on a Hoe"
| Tha Dogg Pound, The Lady of Rage
|-
! scope="row" | "Need to Learn"
| The Visionaries, Rakaa, Brother J, Sadat X, YZ
| rowspan="1" | We Are the Ones (We've Been Waiting For)
|-
! scope="row" | "What Does It Takes"
| rowspan="4" | 2007
| Snoop Dogg, MC Eiht
| rowspan="1" | CT Experience: The DVD Files
|-
! scope="row" | "Ruff N Uff"
| Korn, Chilly Chill
| rowspan="1" | Rap Sessions
|-
! scope="row" | "Bucc 'Em| Tha Dogg Pound, Snoop Dogg
| rowspan="1" | Dogg Chit|-
! scope="row" | "Voodoo"
| X Clan, Quazedelic
| rowspan="1" | Return From Mecca|-
! scope="row" | "Set For Action"
| rowspan="1" | 2008
| Doc Ce, Prodege
| rowspan="1" | Qualified Hustla|-
! scope="row" | "Ten Steps and Draw"
| rowspan="9" | 2009
| B.G. Knocc Out
| rowspan="1" | BG Knocc Out Presents... Tha Mixtape|-
! scope="row" | "Ain't Nobody"
| Daddy V, Hobo
| rowspan="4" | OG Daddy V Presents Compton N Longbeach|-
! scope="row" | "Wake Up"
| Daddy V, Att Will, Gangsta Dresta, Tha Chill
|-
! scope="row" | "Always Stay on Yoe Toes"
| Daddy V, Big2DaBoy, Keboe, KD
|-
! scope="row" | "Cool, I'm Wit It"
| Daddy V, OG Cuicide, Caviar
|-
! scope="row" | "My Hood"
| T-1
| rowspan="2" | Mo Thug West Mixtape Vol. 2: Thug West|-
! scope="row" | "City Lights"
|-
! scope="row" | "Mic Check"
| Young Trav, MC Eiht, CMW
| rowspan="1" | The Black & Brown Mixtape Vol. 1|-
! scope="row" | "Freestyle"
| Big2DaBoy
| rowspan="1" | Dr. Dre Presents Detox Chronicles Vol. 2|-
! scope="row" | "French Connect"
| rowspan="4" | 2010
| Daddy V
| rowspan="1" | OG Daddy V Presents LA French Connection|-
! scope="row" | "D.P.G. 2010"
| Tha Dogg Pound
| rowspan="2" | 100 Wayz|-
! scope="row" | "Another Clip"
| Tha Dogg Pound, Soopafly
|-
! scope="row" | "The Preformation"
| Bishop Lamont, Kurupt
| rowspan="1" | The Shawshank Redemption/Angola 3|-
! scope="row" | "Everywhere I Go"
| rowspan="1" | 2011
| Daddy V, Kokane, Tha Chill
| rowspan="1" | Tha Original Hustla|-
! scope="row" | "Intro"
| rowspan="3" | 2012
| Lil' ½ Dead
| rowspan="2" | Dead Serious|-
! scope="row" | "I Love This Game"
| Lil' ½ Dead, Moe Z MD
|-
! scope="row" | "Dos Equis"
| Xzibit, The Game
| rowspan="1" | Napalm|-
! scope="row" | "Sleeper Cell"
| rowspan="1" | 2018
| Brainwash
| rowspan="1" | Amygdala 
|}

 Filmography 
 Tha Eastsidaz (2000)
 DPG Eulogy (2005)
 Rhyme and Punishment'' (2011)

References

1968 births
Living people
21st-century American rappers
21st-century American male musicians
African-American male rappers
American hip hop singers
Death Row Records artists
Five percenters
Gangsta rappers
Horrorcore artists
G-funk artists
Musicians from Long Beach, California
Rappers from Los Angeles
West Coast hip hop musicians